The 1984–85 Houston Rockets season saw the Rockets draft Akeem Olajuwon. He was selected to play in the 1985 NBA All-Star Game.

In the playoffs, the Rockets lost to the Utah Jazz in five games in the First Round.

Draft picks

Roster

Regular season

Season standings

Record vs. opponents

Game log

Regular season

|- align="center" bgcolor="#ccffcc"
| 1
| October 27, 1984
| @ Dallas
| W 121–111
|
|
|
| Reunion Arena
| 1–0
|- align="center" bgcolor="#ccffcc"
| 2
| October 30, 1984
| Dallas
| W 106–84
|
|
|
| The Summit
| 2–0

|- align="center" bgcolor="#ccffcc"
| 3
| November 1, 1984
| @ Kansas City
| W 109–106
|
|
|
| Kemper Arena
| 3–0
|- align="center" bgcolor="#ccffcc"
| 4
| November 3, 1984
| New York
| W 105–93
|
|
|
| The Summit
| 4–0
|- align="center" bgcolor="#ccffcc"
| 5
| November 6, 1984
| Kansas City
| W 108–94
|
|
|
| The Summit
| 5–0
|- align="center" bgcolor="#ccffcc"
| 6
| November 8, 1984
| Seattle
| W 99–89
|
|
|
| The Summit
| 6–0
|- align="center" bgcolor="#ccffcc"
| 7
| November 10, 1984
| L.A. Clippers
| W 117–92
|
|
|
| The Summit
| 7–0
|- align="center" bgcolor="#ccffcc"
| 8
| November 13, 1984
| Cleveland
| W 106–98
|
|
|
| The Summit
| 8–0
|- align="center" bgcolor="#ffcccc"
| 9
| November 14, 1984
| @ Indiana
| L 117–125
|
|
|
| Market Square Arena
| 8–1
|- align="center" bgcolor="#ffcccc"
| 10
| November 16, 1984
| @ Denver
| L 102–119
|
|
|
| McNichols Sports Arena
| 8–2
|- align="center" bgcolor="#ccffcc"
| 11
| November 17, 1984
| San Antonio
| W 141–133
|
|
|
| The Summit
| 9–2
|- align="center" bgcolor="#ccffcc"
| 12
| November 20, 1984
| Detroit
| W 123–117
|
|
|
| The Summit
| 10–2
|- align="center" bgcolor="#ffcccc"
| 13
| November 23, 1984
| @ Utah
| L 98–111
|
|
|
| Salt Palace Acord Arena
| 10–3
|- align="center" bgcolor="#ffcccc"
| 14
| November 24, 1984
| @ Dallas
| L 95–113
|
|
|
| Reunion Arena
| 10–4
|- align="center" bgcolor="#ccffcc"
| 15
| November 27, 1984
| @ San Antonio
| W 114–97
|
|
|
| HemisFair Arena
| 11–4
|- align="center" bgcolor="#ffcccc"
| 16
| November 28, 1984
| Boston
| L 100–110
|
|
|
| The Summit
| 11–5
|- align="center" bgcolor="#ccffcc"
| 17
| November 30, 1984
| @ Atlanta
| W 116–102
|
|
|
| The Omni
| 12–5

|- align="center" bgcolor="#ffcccc"
| 18
| December 1, 1984
| Seattle
| L 86–94
|
|
|
| The Summit
| 12–6
|- align="center" bgcolor="#ffcccc"
| 19
| December 4, 1984
| L.A. Clippers
| L 100–116
|
|
|
| The Summit
| 12–7
|- align="center" bgcolor="#ffcccc"
| 20
| December 6, 1984
| @ Golden State
| L 113–114
|
|
|
| Oakland-Alameda County Coliseum Arena
| 12–8
|- align="center" bgcolor="#ccffcc"
| 21
| December 8, 1984
| @ Portland
| W 127–120
|
|
|
| Memorial Coliseum
| 13–8
|- align="center" bgcolor="#ffcccc"
| 22
| December 9, 1984
| @ Seattle
| L 90–96
|
|
|
| Kingdome
| 13–9
|- align="center" bgcolor="#ffcccc"
| 23
| December 11, 1984
| @ Phoenix
| L 112–120
|
|
|
| Arizona Veterans Memorial Coliseum
| 13–10
|- align="center" bgcolor="#ccffcc"
| 24
| December 13, 1984
| Atlanta
| W 96–93
|
|
|
| The Summit
| 14–10
|- align="center" bgcolor="#ccffcc"
| 25
| December 15, 1984
| Dallas
| W 117–115
|
|
|
| The Summit
| 15–10
|- align="center" bgcolor="#ccffcc"
| 26
| December 18, 1984
| @ Chicago
| W 104–96
|
|
|
| Chicago Stadium
| 16–10
|- align="center" bgcolor="#ffcccc"
| 27
| December 19, 19847:00p.m. CST
| L.A. Lakers
| L 116–123
| Sampson (21)
| Sampson (10)
| Hollins (15)
| The Summit16,016
| 16–11
|- align="center" bgcolor="#ccffcc"
| 28
| December 22, 1984
| Denver
| W 125–107
|
|
|
| The Summit
| 17–11
|- align="center" bgcolor="#ffcccc"
| 29
| December 26, 1984
| @ Milwaukee
| L 87–97
|
|
|
| MECCA Arena
| 17–12
|- align="center" bgcolor="#ffcccc"
| 30
| December 27, 1984
| @ Kansas City
| L 92–96
|
|
|
| Kemper Arena
| 17–13
|- align="center" bgcolor="#ccffcc"
| 31
| December 29, 1984
| Portland
| W 108–92
|
|
|
| The Summit
| 18–13

|- align="center" bgcolor="#ccffcc"
| 32
| January 2, 1985
| @ Denver
| W 113–111
|
|
|
| McNichols Sports Arena
| 19–13
|- align="center" bgcolor="#ccffcc"
| 33
| January 5, 1985
| @ Golden State
| W 103–94
|
|
|
| Oakland-Alameda County Coliseum Arena
| 20–13
|- align="center" bgcolor="#ffcccc"
| 34
| January 6, 1985
| @ Utah
| L 92–121
|
|
|
| Salt Palace Acord Arena
| 20–14
|- align="center" bgcolor="#ccffcc"
| 35
| January 8, 1985
| Kansas City
| W 112–110
|
|
|
| The Summit
| 21–14
|- align="center" bgcolor="#ffcccc"
| 36
| January 11, 1985
| @ Philadelphia
| L 108–115
|
|
|
| The Spectrum
| 21–15
|- align="center" bgcolor="#ffcccc"
| 37
| January 13, 1985
| @ New Jersey
| L 99–100
|
|
|
| Brendan Byrne Arena
| 21–16
|- align="center" bgcolor="#ffcccc"
| 38
| January 15, 1985
| @ Portland
| L 117–121
|
|
|
| Memorial Coliseum
| 21–17
|- align="center" bgcolor="#ffcccc"
| 39
| January 16, 1985
| @ L.A. Clippers
| L 88–98
|
|
|
| Los Angeles Memorial Sports Arena
| 21–18
|- align="center" bgcolor="#ccffcc"
| 40
| January 18, 1985
| @ Phoenix
| W 112–101
|
|
|
| Arizona Veterans Memorial Coliseum
| 22–18
|- align="center" bgcolor="#ccffcc"
| 41
| January 19, 1985
| Utah
| W 120–95
|
|
|
| The Summit
| 23–18
|- align="center" bgcolor="#ccffcc"
| 42
| January 22, 1985
| Phoenix
| W 101–97
|
|
|
| The Summit
| 24–18
|- align="center" bgcolor="#ffcccc"
| 43
| January 25, 1985
| San Antonio
| L 107–122
|
|
|
| The Summit
| 24–19
|- align="center" bgcolor="#ffcccc"
| 44
| January 26, 1985
| Milwaukee
| L 102–105
|
|
|
| The Summit
| 24–20
|- align="center" bgcolor="#ccffcc"
| 45
| January 28, 1985
| New Jersey
| W 97–93
|
|
|
| The Summit
| 25–20
|- align="center" bgcolor="#ccffcc"
| 46
| January 30, 19859:30p.m. CST
| @ L.A. Lakers
| W 116–113
| Olajuwon (24)
| Sampson (10)
| Hollins (12)
| The Forum17,505
| 26–20

|- align="center" bgcolor="#ccffcc"
| 47
| February 2, 1985
| Denver
| W 131–128 (2OT)
|
|
|
| The Summit
| 27–20
|- align="center" bgcolor="#ffcccc"
| 48
| February 5, 19857:00p.m. CST
| L.A. Lakers
| L 104–113
| Sampson (33)
| Sampson (13)
| Lloyd (8)
| The Summit16,016
| 27–21
|- align="center" bgcolor="#ccffcc"
| 49
| February 7, 1985
| Golden State
| W 112–105
|
|
|
| The Summit
| 28–21
|- align="center"
|colspan="9" bgcolor="#bbcaff"|All-Star Break
|- style="background:#cfc;"
|- bgcolor="#bbffbb"
|- align="center" bgcolor="#ccffcc"
| 50
| February 12, 1985
| Phoenix
| W 126–114
|
|
|
| The Summit
| 29–21
|- align="center" bgcolor="#ccffcc"
| 51
| February 14, 1985
| @ New York
| W 113–105
|
|
|
| Madison Square Garden
| 31–20
|- align="center" bgcolor="#ccffcc"
| 52
| February 16, 1985
| @ Cleveland
| W 122–115
|
|
|
| Richfield Coliseum
| 31–21
|- align="center" bgcolor="#ffcccc"
| 53
| February 19, 1985
| Dallas
| L 115–124
|
|
|
| The Summit
| 31–22
|- align="center" bgcolor="#ccffcc"
| 54
| February 20, 1985
| @ Phoenix
| W 126–122
|
|
|
| Arizona Veterans Memorial Coliseum
| 32–22
|- align="center" bgcolor="#ccffcc"
| 55
| February 22, 1985
| Portland
| W 117–103
|
|
|
| The Summit
| 33–22
|- align="center" bgcolor="#ffcccc"
| 56
| February 23, 1985
| Washington
| L 115–123
|
|
|
| The Summit
| 33–23
|- align="center" bgcolor="#ffcccc"
| 57
| February 26, 19859:30p.m. CST
| @ L.A. Lakers
| L 94–100
| Olajuwon (21)
| Olajuwon (16)
| McCray (8)
| The Forum17,505
| 33–24
|- align="center" bgcolor="#ccffcc"
| 58
| February 27, 1985
| @ L.A. Clippers
| W 117–109
|
|
|
| Los Angeles Memorial Sports Arena
| 34–24

|- align="center" bgcolor="#ccffcc"
| 59
| March 1, 1985
| @ Utah
| W 119–115
|
|
|
| Salt Palace Acord Arena
| 35–24
|- align="center" bgcolor="#ccffcc"
| 60
| March 3, 1985
| Philadelphia
| W 99–90
|
|
|
| The Summit
| 36–24
|- align="center" bgcolor="#ffcccc"
| 61
| March 5, 1985
| @ Denver
| L 131–133 (2OT)
|
|
|
| McNichols Sports Arena
| 36–25
|- align="center" bgcolor="#ffcccc"
| 62
| March 6, 1985
| Utah
| L 90–94
|
|
|
| The Summit
| 36–26
|- align="center" bgcolor="#ccffcc"
| 63
| March 8, 1985
| Indiana
| W 125–105
|
|
|
| The Summit
| 37–26
|- align="center" bgcolor="#ccffcc"
| 64
| March 9, 1985
| @ San Antonio
| W 123–117
|
|
|
| HemisFair Arena
| 38–26
|- align="center" bgcolor="#ccffcc"
| 65
| March 12, 1985
| Denver
| W 131–129
|
|
|
| The Summit
| 39–26
|- align="center" bgcolor="#ffcccc"
| 66
| March 15, 1985
| @ Washington
| L 114–120
|
|
|
| Capital Centre
| 39–27
|- align="center" bgcolor="#ffcccc"
| 67
| March 17, 1985
| @ Boston
| L 120–134
|
|
|
| Boston Garden
| 39–28
|- align="center" bgcolor="#ccffcc"
| 68
| March 19, 1985
| Chicago
| W 106–100
|
|
|
| The Summit
| 40–28
|- align="center" bgcolor="#ffcccc"
| 69
| March 22, 19857:30p.m. CST
| L.A. Lakers
| L 107–130
| McCray (21)
| Sampson (10)
| Lloyd, Lucas, McCray, Sampson (5)
| The Summit16,018
| 40–29
|- align="center" bgcolor="#ccffcc"
| 70
| March 26, 1985
| Kansas City
| W 115–93
|
|
|
| The Summit
| 41–29
|- align="center" bgcolor="#ffcccc"
| 71
| March 27, 1985
| @ Detroit
| L 110–127
|
|
|
| Joe Louis Arena
| 41–30
|- align="center" bgcolor="#ccffcc"
| 72
| March 29, 1985
| Golden State
| W 121–116
|
|
|
| The Summit
| 42–30
|- align="center" bgcolor="#ccffcc"
| 73
| March 30, 1985
| Utah
| W 106–96
|
|
|
| The Summit
| 43–30

|- align="center" bgcolor="#ccffcc"
| 74
| April 1, 1985
| @ Seattle
| W 127–116
|
|
|
| Kingdome
| 44–30
|- align="center" bgcolor="#ffcccc"
| 75
| April 2, 1985
| @ Portland
| L 113–127
|
|
|
| Memorial Coliseum
| 44–31
|- align="center" bgcolor="#ffcccc"
| 76
| April 4, 1985
| @ Golden State
| L 108–113
|
|
|
| Oakland-Alameda County Coliseum Arena
| 44–32
|- align="center" bgcolor="#ccffcc"
| 77
| April 6, 1985
| @ Dallas
| W 139–127 (2OT)
|
|
|
| Reunion Arena
| 45–32
|- align="center" bgcolor="#ffcccc"
| 78
| April 7, 1985
| @ San Antonio
| L 105–126
|
|
|
| HemisFair Arena
| 45–33
|- align="center" bgcolor="#ccffcc"
| 79
| April 9, 1985
| San Antonio
| W 124–103
|
|
|
| The Summit
| 46–33
|- align="center" bgcolor="#ccffcc"
| 80
| April 11, 1985
| @ Kansas City
| W 125–123
|
|
|
| Kemper Arena
| 47–33
|- align="center" bgcolor="#ffcccc"
| 81
| April 12, 1985
| L.A. Clippers
| L 110–115
|
|
|
| The Summit
| 47–34
|- align="center" bgcolor="#ccffcc"
| 82
| April 14, 1985
| Seattle
| W 121–98
|
|
|
| The Summit
| 48–34

Playoffs

|- align="center" bgcolor="#ffcccc"
| 1
| April 19, 1985
| Utah
| L 101–115
| Sampson (26)
| Sampson (24)
| Hollins (7)
| The Summit13,185
| 0–1
|- align="center" bgcolor="#ccffcc"
| 2
| April 21, 1985
| Utah
| W 122–96
| Lloyd (27)
| Sampson (14)
| Lloyd, Lucas (6)
| The Summit14,139
| 1–1
|- align="center" bgcolor="#ffcccc"
| 3
| April 24, 1985
| @ Utah
| L 104–112
| Olajuwon (26)
| Olajuwon (16)
| Lucas (7)
| Salt Palace Acord Arena12,316
| 1–2
|- align="center" bgcolor="#ccffcc"
| 4
| April 26, 1985
| @ Utah
| W 96–94
| Sampson, Olajuwon (18)
| Sampson (18)
| Lucas (5)
| Salt Palace Acord Arena12,690
| 2–2
|- align="center" bgcolor="#ffcccc"
| 5
| April 28, 1985
| Utah
| L 97–104
| Olajuwon (32)
| Sampson (10)
| Olajuwon (14)
| The Summit16,016
| 2–3
|-

Player statistics

Season

Playoffs

Awards and records

Awards
 Ralph Sampson, NBA All-Star Game Most Valuable Player Award
 Akeem Olajuwon, NBA All-Defensive Second Team
 Akeem Olajuwon, NBA All-Rookie Team 1st Team

Records

Transactions

Trades

Free agents

Additions

Subtractions

See also
1984–85 NBA season

References

Houston Rockets seasons
Hou